The Military ranks of Haiti are the military insignia used by the Defence Force of Haiti.

Historic ranks
The historic ranks used by the Armed Forces of Haiti, used until 1995.

Commissioned officer ranks
The rank insignia of commissioned officers.

Other ranks
The rank insignia of non-commissioned officers and enlisted personnel.

References

External links
 

Haiti
Military of Haiti